Spirit of Alaska Federal Credit Union (SoAFCU) is the largest National Credit Union Administration insured credit union based in Fairbanks, Alaska. There are three branches with ATMs in the Fairbanks area. SoAFCU has around ten thousand members. Any person who lives, works, or worships in the Fairbanks North Star Borough is eligible to join the credit union.

History
SoAFCU was originally a small credit union located in the Viking Room of Constitution Hall, University of Alaska Fairbanks. The credit union was started with $32 in a metal cash box and was first named "Greater Fairbanks Teachers’ Credit Union". It was dedicated to non-profit operations for the service and benefit of its member teachers. As the membership grew and expanded to include members north of the Alaska Range, the name was changed in 1975 to "Northern Schools Federal Credit Union". The name was again changed in 2007 to "Spirit of Alaska Federal Credit Union" to reflect the continued expansion of the field of membership and expansive growth of SoAFCU.

SoAFCU opened their newest branch at the corner of Hunter and Johansen in north Fairbanks June 4, 2011.

References

External links
 

1960 establishments in Alaska
Banks established in 1960
Companies based in Fairbanks, Alaska
Credit unions based in Alaska
Education in Fairbanks North Star Borough, Alaska
Non-profit organizations based in Fairbanks, Alaska